Orone Derrick  is a Ugandan politician who serves as a Member of Parliament representing   Gogonyo Constituency  Pallisa District. He was elected on 14 January 2021.  He is a member of National Resistance Movement political party. He serves as a member on the  Appointments Committee in the Parliament of Uganda.

Early life & education background
Orone  was born on 22 January 1988 in Pallisa District. He attended Merryland High School Entebbe for both his 0 & A levels (2001–2007). He graduated with a bachelor's degree  in Public Administration from St. Lawrence University in 2019.

Career

Working experience
He has worked at Maghrib agencies as director operations from 2009 to 2017.
He is the CEO of Rokas Recruitment Services Limited a recruitment agency as well as the CEO of  Rydim Empire  a  Music Events Company which does Artiste music management and Events.

Politics
In  January 2021, he was elected as a Member of Parliament  representing  Gogonyo Constituency Pallisa District in  the eleventh Parliament of Uganda (2021 to 2026)  in the 2021 Ugandan general election and on 21 May 2021 he sworn in as the Member of Parliament.

Personal life
Orone  is married to Mugabi Shifra (since 2018). He belongs to National Resistance Movement.

References

External references
Website of the Parliament of Uganda.
Manager Derrick in a bitter fight with Grenade Official
Manager Derrick Terminates Grenade Official's Music Contract Accusing Him Of Indiscipline And Disrespect. - HOT100 Kampala
NRM Wins the Highest National Seat and The Greatest Number of Legislators In 11th Parliament
2021 Elections: Statistics on the number of MPs who have been declared winners so far

Living people
1988 births
Acholi people
People from Pallisa District
21st-century Ugandan politicians
People from Northern Region, Uganda
Members of the Parliament of Uganda